The 1934 season was the twenty-third season for Santos FC.

References

External links
Official Site 

Santos
1934
1934 in Brazilian football